Cranmer House may refer to:
 Cranmer House (Denver, Colorado), listed on the National Register of Historic Places (NRHP)
 Cranmer Theological House, founded in 1994 in Shreveport, Louisiana and now located in The Woodlands, Texas

See also
Cranmer Park, Denver, Colorado, NRHP-listed